"Stand Beside Me" is a song written by Stephen Allen Davis, and recorded by American country music singer Jo Dee Messina.  It was released in October 1998 as the third single from her album I'm Alright.  The song spent three weeks at the top of the Hot Country Singles & Tracks (now Hot Country Songs) chart, making Messina the first female artist to score three multi-week Number One singles from one album.

Music video
The music video was directed by Jim Shea and premiered in October 1998.

Chart performance
"Stand Beside Me" debuted at number 71 on the U.S. Billboard Hot Country Singles & Tracks for the week of October 10, 1998.

Year-end charts

References

1998 singles
1998 songs
Jo Dee Messina songs
Country ballads
Song recordings produced by Byron Gallimore
Song recordings produced by Tim McGraw
Curb Records singles
Songs written by Stephen Allen Davis